Ōakura is a small township in New Plymouth District, Taranaki, in the western North Island of New Zealand. It is located on State Highway 45, 15 kilometres south-west of New Plymouth. Ōkato is 12 km further south-west. The Oakura River flows past the town and into the North Taranaki Bight. To the south is the Kaitake Range, part of Egmont National Park.

The Oakura Messenger (TOM) was a monthly publication delivered to all letterboxes in the area. It began in October 2000. It was renamed the Oakura post in June 2020.

On 5 July 2007 the town was hit by a tornado, which damaged 60 houses.

Ōakura is well known for its beach—Ōakura Beach. In 2007 it became one of the first Blue Flag accredited beaches in Oceania. Only two others—Fitzroy and East End beach in nearby New Plymouth—received the same award that year. As of 2010, Ōakura Beach has retained its blue flag status.

Demographics

Oakura had a population of 1,539 at the 2018 New Zealand census, an increase of 102 people (7.1%) since the 2013 census, and an increase of 162 people (11.8%) since the 2006 census. There were 558 households, comprising 768 males and 774 females, giving a sex ratio of 0.99 males per female. The median age was 41.7 years (compared with 37.4 years nationally), with 381 people (24.8%) aged under 15 years, 171 (11.1%) aged 15 to 29, 786 (51.1%) aged 30 to 64, and 204 (13.3%) aged 65 or older.

Ethnicities were 93.8% European/Pākehā, 10.3% Māori, 1.4% Pacific peoples, 1.4% Asian, and 2.7% other ethnicities. People may identify with more than one ethnicity.

The percentage of people born overseas was 24.0, compared with 27.1% nationally.

Although some people chose not to answer the census's question about religious affiliation, 57.5% had no religion, 33.7% were Christian, 0.2% were Hindu, 0.2% were Muslim, 0.4% were Buddhist and 2.1% had other religions.

Of those at least 15 years old, 411 (35.5%) people had a bachelor's or higher degree, and 138 (11.9%) people had no formal qualifications. The median income was $40,400, compared with $31,800 nationally. 345 people (29.8%) earned over $70,000 compared to 17.2% nationally. The employment status of those at least 15 was that 576 (49.7%) people were employed full-time, 249 (21.5%) were part-time, and 24 (2.1%) were unemployed.

History

The Ōakura River (and therefore Ōakura township itself) was named after the female ancestor Akura-matapū of the Kurahaupō waka. Ōakura-matapu was the original name of the river, and it literally means "Belonging to Akura-matapū". Akura was married to Okorotua. Ngāti Tairi hapū holds mana whenua in Ōakura. Ngāti Tairi belongs to the larger descent group of Ngā Mahanga a Tairi. Ngāti Tairi and Ngā Māhanga a Tairi are a part of the tribe Taranaki. Ngāti Tairi retain their take ahi kā (rights of ownership) through the marae Ōakura Pā beside the southern side of the Ōakura River. People have been living in the area of Ōakura for hundreds of years.

When war broke out in 1860 during the First Taranaki War, Ngāti Tairi as part of Nga Mahanga and Taranaki joined in the offensives against the British. The nearby Tapuae ridge (north of Ōakura) was a continual site of conflict. In March and April 1863, Governor George Grey established redoubts around Ōakura just prior to the start of the Second Taranaki War, as locations where British troops could be stationed to keep European settlers in New Plymouth safe, and as a base to later retake Tataraimaka to the West. On 4 May 1863 a party of about 40 Māori warriors ambushed a small military party on a coastal road west of the town, killing nine of the 10 soldiers. The revenge attack on the military party, escorting a British defaulter to New Plymouth for trial, reignited hostilities in the Second Taranaki War.

Amenities and services

South Road (better known as Surf Highway 45) is Ōakura's main street, and most local businesses and services are situated around here.

Features and attractions

Apart from its well-known beach, Ōakura's main attraction is Butlers Reef – a bar and music venue that has showcased many well-known New Zealand and international acts, including Dave Dobbyn, Trinity Roots, Gin Wigmore, Katchafire, Supergroove and Jimmy Barnes.

Other places of interest include the township's three parks – Matekai, Corbett and the Shearer Reserve. Also, within five minutes drive south west is Lucy's Gully, a popular beauty spot in the Kaitake ranges that hit the national headlines in 2005 when the body of murdered German tourist Birgit Brauer was discovered there.

Ringcraft Moana is a manufacturing jewellery business with showroom, garden and a large pearl collection of abalone pearls. The Wavehaven, on Surf Highway 45 just south of Ōakura, offers accommodation and access to surfing beaches.

Once a year, Ōakura's artists are opening up their studios to the public in a two weekend event. The Ōakura Arts Trail can be found online

Marae

The local Ōakura or Okorotua marae features the Moana Kaurai meeting house. It is a marae of the Taranaki Māori hapū of Ngāti Tairi.

Koru Pā is a historic reserve and pā situated 3 km south-east of Ōakura township. Thought to be one of the first Māori settlements in Taranaki, Māori tradition recognises it may have been built as early as 1000AD by Nga Mahanga a Tairi, a hapū of the Taranaki iwi.

Education

Oakura School is a coeducational full primary (years 1–8) school with a decile rating of 10 and a roll of  students as of  The school was founded in 1866.

Notable residents
 Ruhira Matekai (also known as Lucy Stevens) was a well-known Māori woman who lived in Ōakura in the 19th century. Lucy's Gully and Matekai Park are named after her.
 Professional surfer Paige Hareb is from Ōakura.

References

Further reading

General historical works

Clubs and organisations
Some of the records concerning the early days of the Oakura Library are held within  in New Plymouth. See

Environment

Māori 
 This is a reprint of a title published in Auckland: under the direction of the Chief Judge, Native Land Court by H. Brett, 1879.

New Zealand Wars

 This is Plate 5 from Journals of the Deputy Quartermaster General in New Zealand, 1864. An electronic copy is available from the National Library of New Zealand.

Maps

People
The papers of Edward Leslie Hughes are held within  in New Plymouth. Within this collection is a manuscript concerning the history of Oakura. See 
Some of the papers of Percy Smith are held within  in New Plymouth. Within this collection is a Taranaki Military Settlers' Land Order, allocating Smith land in the Oakura area. See 
The papers of Marc Frederic Voullaire are held within  in New Plymouth. Within this collection is material concerning the history of the Taranaki dairy industry, the location of the mission station of the Lutheran missionary, Johann Riemenschneider.. See

Schools

External links
 Oakura School website

New Plymouth District
Populated places in Taranaki
Black sand beaches